Nurabad (also Romanized as Nūrābād) is a village in Siyavashan Rural District, in the Central District of Ashtian County, Markazi Province, Iran. At the 2006 census, its population was 121, in 42 families.

References 

Populated places in Ashtian County